Melitara texana is a species of snout moth in the genus Melitara. It was described by Herbert H. Neunzig in 1997 and is found in southern Texas and adjacent Mexico.

The larvae feed on Opuntia lindheimeri var. lindheimeri. Young larvae hollow out a small cell under the epidermis near the margin of the cladode. They remain in this cell during winter. In April, they tunnel farther into the cladode. Pupation takes place in late August and September within hollow stems of their host plant.

References

Moths described in 1997
Phycitini